Gary Holloway is the executive director of the World Convention of Churches of Christ.

Life
Gary Holloway ministered with Holland Street Church of Christ in San Marcos, Texas. He then taught at Austin Graduate School of Theology in Austin, Texas, followed by Lipscomb University in Nashville, Tennessee, where he served as an Ijams Professor of Spirituality and their Director of Graduate Bible Studies. Holloway became the executive director of the World Convention of Churches of Christ in August 2010. He serves at Natchez Trace Church of Christ in Nashville, Tennessee. He is a senior fellow with Institute for Christian Spirituality, Lipscomb University. Holloway has authored numerous books, including several books on prayer and several books for the Meditative Commentary series. He is a lifetime member of the Disciples of Christ Historical Society.

Education
B.A. Freed–Hardeman College
M.A.R. Harding School of Theology
M.L.I.S. University of Texas
Ph.D. Emory University

Publications
Saint, Demons and Asses: Southern Preacher Anecdotes, Bloomington, Illinois: Indiana University Press, 1989. .
O.B. Perkins and the Southern Oratorical Preaching Tradition (Studies in American Religion), Lewiston, New York: Edwin Mellen Press, 1992. .
In the Name of Jesus: Receiving Power from the Prayers of the New Testament, Hurst, Texas: Sweet Publishing, 1994. .
The College Press NIV Commentary: James & Jude, Joplin, Missouri: College Press Publishing, 1996. .
A Miracle Named Jesus, Joplin, Missouri: College Press Publishing, 1997. .
Main Thing: A New Look at Ecclesiastes, Abilene, Texas: Abilene Christian University Press, 1997. .
The Unexpected Jesus: A Surprising Look at the Savior, Joplin, Missouri: College Press Publishing, 1998. .
Theology Matters: In Honor of Harold Hazelip: Answers for the Church Today, with Mark C. Black, Harold Hazelip, Joplin, Missouri: College Press Publishing, 1998. .
Certain Hope: An Encouraging Word from Hebrews, Abilene, Texas: Abilene Christian University Press, 1999. .
Praying Like Jesus: What the New Testament Teaches about Prayer, Covenant Publishing. 2000. .
Radical Answers from the Minor Prophets, Abilene, Texas: Hillcrest Press, 2001. .
Renewing God's People: A Concise History of Churches of Christ, with Douglas A. Foster, Abilene, Texas: Abilene Christian University Press, 2001. .
Streams of Mercy: Acts, Abilene, Texas: Hillcrest Press, 2002. .
Unfinished Reconciliation: Justice, Racism and Churches of Christ, Abilene, Texas: Abilene Christian University Press, 2003. .
Alone with God, with James H. Garrison, Orange, California: Leafwood Publishers, 2003. .
Home Among Strangers: In the World with Christ, Covenant Publishing, 2003. .
Living God's Love: An Invitation to Christian Spirituality, with Earl Lavender, Abilene, Texas: Leafwood Publishers, 2004. .
Meditative Commentary: Matthew: Jesus is King, Abilene, Texas: Leafwood Publishers, 2005. .
Renewing God's People: A Concise History of Churches of Christ, 2nd. Edition, with Douglas A. Foster, Abilene, Texas: Abilene Christian University Press, 2006. .
Meditative Commentary: 1 & 2 Thessalonians, 1 & 2 Timothy and Titus: Jesus Grows His Church, Abilene, Texas: Leafwood Publishers, 2006. .
Meditative Commentary: Romans and Galatians: The Spirit of Jesus, Abilene, Texas: Leafwood Publishers, 2006. .
Meditative Commentary: John: Believing in Jesus, Abilene, Texas: Leafwood Publishers, 2007. .
Meditative Commentary: Hebrews and James: Brother Jesus, Abilene, Texas: Leafwood Publishers, 2007. .
Daily Disciple: A One-Year Devotional Guide, Abilene, Texas: Leafwood Publishers, 2008. .
Meditative Commentary: The Letters of Peter, John, and Jude: Living in Jesus, Abilene, Texas: Leafwood Publishers, 2008. .
You Might Be Too Busy If..., Spiritual Practices for People in a Hurry, Abilene, Texas: Leafwood Publishers, 2009. .
Renewal for Mission: A Concise History of Christian Churches and Churches of Christ, with Dennis Helsabeck and Douglas A. Foster, Abilene, Texas: Abilene Christian University Press, 2009. .
Praying Dangerously: Daring Prayers for Meaningful Faith, Abilene, Texas: Leafwood Publishers, 2010. .
Renewing Christian Unity: A Concise History of the Christian Church (Disciples of Christ), with Mark Toulouse and Douglas A. Foster, Abilene, Texas: Abilene Christian University Press, 2010. .
A Month With Jesus: 31 Days with a Surprising Savior, Abilene, Texas: Leafwood Publishers, 2012. .
Unfinished Reconciliation: Justice, Racism and Churches of Christ, 2nd enlarged Edition, Abilene, Texas: Abilene Christian University Press, 2013. .

References

Restoration Movement
Harding University alumni
University of Texas alumni
Emory University faculty
Lipscomb University faculty
Ministers of the Churches of Christ
American members of the Churches of Christ
Living people
Year of birth missing (living people)